The 1906–07 Cornell Big Red men's ice hockey season was the 6th season of play for the program.

Season
After laying fallow for two years the men's team returned to the ice. The Big Red played their first official home games this season at a rink constructed on Beebe Lake. While the season was short the fact that the icers had resurfaced was enough to provide some optimism for the program.

Roster

Standings

Schedule and Results

|-
!colspan=12 style=";" | Regular Season

Scoring Statistics

Note: Assists were not recorded as a statistic.

References

Cornell Big Red men's ice hockey seasons
Cornell
Cornell
Cornell
Cornell